Mai Tai Sing (December 22, 1923 – July 11, 2018) was an American actress and businesswoman. Her acting credits include the TV series Hong Kong, Forbidden, and Strange Portrait.

Background
She was born in Oakland, California as May Tsang. Most of her young years were in Hong Kong. When she was about fourteen, she and her family moved back to the California Bay area. One of her early jobs was waitressing at the Forbidden City nightclub. It was there she became interested in performing.

In the early 1940s, she became a chorus girl there. She met Wilbur and Jessie Tai Sing, a dancing duo. Later she replaced Jessie. By 1942, she was married to Wilbur Tai Sing and had two children to him.

In the 1960s she became romantically involved with actor Jeffrey Hunter. An article in The Milwaukee Sentinel said that they were to be married. At this time they had been working together in the film Strange Portrait. In the 1970s she relocated to Hawaii.

Film and television roles

Film
In 1953, she appeared in a film with Tony Curtis, playing the part of Soo Lee. Forbidden was directed by Rudolph Maté. Other cast included Joanne Dru and Victor Sen Yung.  Her last film role was in the ill-fated Strange Portrait that starred Jeffry Hunter. In this film she played a wealthy but reclusive and insane woman living alone in a mansion who has an obsession with a portrait of her husband that had abandoned her.

Television
In the 1950s she appeared in two episodes of The New Adventures of China Smith aka The Affairs of China Smith which was an action/adventure series about an American adventurer living in Singapore. The main role was played by Dan Duryea. In the early 1960s  had a recurring role as Ching Mei in the series Hong Kong. 
 She played the owner of The Golden Dragon, a supper club. The cast included Rod Taylor and Lloyd Bochner.

She would also host Charlie Chan films on channel 44, a local San Francisco television station.

Club management

She had an association with clubs that goes back to the 1940s as a chorus girl, she would eventually end up in management. One of the clubs that she ran was The Rickshaw in San Francisco. That club is known for a night when John Lennon, Ringo Starr and Billy Preston stopped by.

She moved to Hawaii in the 1970s. Another club she managed was "Trappers", located in the Hyatt Waikiki. The club featured the Betty Loo Taylor Trio. She was hostess and manager there until her retirement in 2003 at age 79. Her retirement marked 28 years of management and hosting at Trappers and later at the Ciao Mein.

Filmography

Television
 Jake and the Fatman,  Eipisode: "Chinatown, My Chinatown" (1990) ... Hostess
 Hawaii Five-O,  Episode: "Wooden Model of a Rat" (1975) ... Reporter #2
 Sam Benedict Episode: "Nothing Equals Nothing" ... Lily Sin
 Hong Kong, Episode: "The Runaway" (1961) ... Ching Mei 
 Hong Kong, Episode: "Murder by Proxy" (1961) ... Ching Mei 
 Hong Kong, Episode: "With Deadly Sorrow" (1961) ... Ching Mei
 Hong Kong, Episode: "The Hunted" (1961) ... Ching Mei 
 Hong Kong, Episode: "Lesson in Fear" (1961) ... Ching Mei 
 Hong Kong, Episode: "Suitable for Framing" (1961) ... Ching Mei
 The New Adventures of China Smith Episode: "The Black Wings of the Fire Bird" (1954) ... Moonflower 
 The New Adventures of China Smith Episode: "The Talons of Tongking" (1954) ... Ah Chee

Film
 The Golden Horde (1951) ... Dancer 
 Forbidden (1953) ... Soo Lee 
 Strange Portrait (1966)
 Forbidden City U.S.A  (1988) ... Archival footage

Links
 Mai Tai Sing Historical Essay

References

1923 births
2018 deaths
20th-century American actresses
Actresses from Oakland, California
American actresses of Chinese descent
American showgirls
American female dancers
Nightclub owners
American television actresses
American film actresses
American expatriates in British Hong Kong